Miisa-Leena Päällysaho (19 February 1970 – 7 July 2016), better known as Miisa, was a Finnish Eurodance artist who released two albums in the 1990s.

Her first single was released in Finland in 1991 and in the mid-1990s Miisa was trying to break into the US markets. Her biggest hit was the single Set Me Free, reaching #9 on the Billboard compiled Dance Club Songs chart in March 1996. The song All or Nothing (1994) was included on the soundtrack to the 1999 comedy But I'm a Cheerleader.

It was later revealed that Miisa did not actually sing on her records, but the real vocalist was the Swedish singer Karin Strömfelt. After her music career, Miisa worked as a make-up artist. She died of cancer on 7 July 2016, aged 46.

Discography 
Albums
Attitude (1994)
Miisa (1995, US 1996)
Singles
Upside Down (1991)
Set Me Free (1993, US 1996)
Hold On (1993)
All or Nothing (1994, US 1995)
You & Me (Innocence) (1994)
Lovin' U (1995)
How Will I Know (1996)
Get Ready (1996)
If

References

External links

1970 births
2016 deaths
Musicians from Turku
Finnish fraudsters
20th-century Finnish women singers
Eurodance musicians
Musical hoaxes
Music controversies
Entertainment scandals